Cornelis "Kees" Boertien (26 July 1927 – 30 May 2002) was a Dutch politician of the defunct Anti-Revolutionary Party (ARP) and later the Christian Democratic Appeal (CDA) party and jurist.

Boertien attended a Gymnasium in Zwolle from April 1939 until May 1946 and applied at the Utrecht University in June 1946 majoring in Law and obtaining a Bachelor of Laws degree in July 1948 and worked as student researcher before graduating with a Master of Laws degree on 13 December 1952. Boertien worked as an office clerk for a printing office in Zwolle from June 1946 until August 1947 and for an insurance company in Utrecht from August 1947 until December 1952. Boertien worked as an accountant for the Institute of Registered Accountants from December 1952 until September 1960. Boertien worked as a paralegal for Philips in Eindhoven from September 1960 until October 1965. Boertien applied at the Free University Amsterdam in July 1958 for a postgraduate education in Law and worked as a researcher at the Free University Amsterdam before he got an doctorate as an Doctor of Law on 13 April 1962. Boertien served on the Anti-Revolutionary Party Executive Board from February 1960 until May 1965.

Boertien became a Member of the House of Representatives after Jan Smallenbroek was appointed as Minister of the Interior in the Cabinet Cals following the cabinet formation of 1965, taking office on 18 May 1965 serving as a frontbencher and spokesperson for Justice, Law enforcement, Transport, Postal Services, Medical Ethics, Gambling and deputy spokesperson for Social Affairs and the Royal Family. Boertien was selected as a Member of the European Parliament and dual served in those positions, taking office on 8 May 1967. After the election of 1971 Boertien was appointed as Minister for Development Cooperation in the Cabinet Biesheuvel I, taking office on 14 July 1971. The Cabinet Biesheuvel I fell just one year later on 19 July 1972 after the Democratic Socialists '70 (DS'70) retracted their support following there dissatisfaction with the proposed budget memorandum to further reduce the deficit and continued to serve in a demissionary capacity until the first cabinet formation of 1972 when it was replaced by the caretaker Cabinet Biesheuvel II with Boertien continuing as Minister for Development Cooperation, taking office on 9 August 1972. After the election of 1972 Boertien returned as a Member of the House of Representatives, taking office on 7 December 1972 but he was still serving in the cabinet and because of dualism customs in the constitutional convention of Dutch politics he couldn't serve a dual mandate he subsequently resigned as a Member of the House of Representatives on 7 March 1973. Following the second cabinet formation of 1972 Boertien was not giving a cabinet post in the new cabinet, the Cabinet Biesheuvel II was replaced by the Cabinet Den Uyl on 11 May 1973. Boertien subsequently returned as a Member of the House of Representatives after Antoon Veerman was appointment as State Secretary for Education and Sciences in the new cabinet, taking office on 28 May 1973 serving as a frontbencher chairing the parliamentary committee for Kingdom Relations and the special parliamentary committee for European Parliamentary Reforms and spokesperson for Foreign Affairs, Defence, European Affairs, Benelux Union and deputy spokesperson for Medical Ethics and Abortion.

In December 1974 Boertien was nominated as Queen's Commissioner of Zeeland, he resigned as Member of the House of Representatives the same day he was installed as Queen's Commissioner, serving from 16 January 1975 until 1 August 1992. Boertien also became active in the private sector and public sector and occupied numerous seats as a corporate director and nonprofit director on several boards of directors and supervisory boards and served on several state commissions and councils on behalf of the government (Advisory Council for Spatial Planning, Council for Culture, Cadastre Agency and the Public Pension Funds PFZW).

Decorations

References

External links

Official
  Dr. C. (Kees) Boertien Parlement & Politiek

 

1927 births
2002 deaths
Anti-Revolutionary Party MEPs
Anti-Revolutionary Party politicians
Christian Democratic Appeal politicians
Dutch accountants
Dutch corporate directors
Dutch management consultants
Dutch nonprofit directors
Grand Officers of the Order of Orange-Nassau
King's and Queen's Commissioners of Zeeland
Knights of the Order of the Netherlands Lion
Members of the House of Representatives (Netherlands)
MEPs for the Netherlands 1958–1979
Ministers for Development Cooperation of the Netherlands
People from Enschede
People from Vlissingen
Philips employees
Reformed Churches Christians from the Netherlands
Utrecht University alumni
Academic staff of Utrecht University
Vrije Universiteit Amsterdam alumni
Academic staff of Vrije Universiteit Amsterdam
20th-century Dutch civil servants
20th-century Dutch jurists
20th-century Dutch politicians